Neofinetia was a genus of flowering plants from the orchid family, Orchidaceae, that is now classified as a Vanda. It contained three species and was distributed in China, Korea, and Japan.

Species 
 Neofinetia falcata (Thunberg) Hu, Rhodora 27: 107. 1925.
The type species of the former genus, it is known as 风兰 (feng lan) in China, where it is found in (N Fujian, S Gansu, SW Hubei, W Jiangxi, Sichuan, Zhejiang); 풍란 (pungnan) in Korea; and 風蘭 (fũran) in Japan, where it is found in (Honshu from the Kantō region westwards, Shikoku, Kyushu, and Ryukyu Islands.)

 Neofinetia richardsiana Christenson, Lindleyana 11: 220. 1996.
Resembling N. falcata but with short nectar spurs, it is known as 短距风兰 (duan ju feng lan) in China, where it is found in (Chongqing).

 Neofinetia xichangnensis Z. J. Liu & S. C. Chen, Acta Bot. Yunnan. 26: 300. 2004.
Known as 西昌风兰 (xi chang feng lan) in China, it is found in (SW Sichuan). (There is some controversy on whether N. xichangnensis is a true species, or just a large form of N. richardsiana.)

Botanical history 
The type species was introduced to the West from Japan by Carl Peter Thunberg in 1784, and placed in the genus Orchis. In 1925 H. H. Hu created Neofinetia as a monotypic genus. Neofinetia is named in honor of Achille Eugène Finet, a French botanist and author of Contributions a la Flore de L'Asie Orientale.  The Greek prefix neo, (new) was added to distinguish it from another plant genus named earlier to honor Finet.

Intergeneric hybrids 
In horticulture, Neofinetia was abbreviated as Neof. In the last part of the 20th century, it gained a great deal of attention in hybrid programs with other vandaceous orchids, thanks to its relative hardiness, scent, compact size, and above all, ease of culture. The names below are all obsolete, since Neofinetia is now synonymous with Vanda. For example, × Aeridofinetia is now × Aeridovanda.

 Neofinetia × Aerides = Aeridofinetia
 Neofinetia × Angraecum = Neograecum
 Neofinetia × Ascocentrum = Ascofinetia
 Neofinetia × Ascoglossum = Neoglossum
 Neofinetia × Cleisocentron = Cleisofinetia
 Neofinetia × Doritis = Dorifinetia
 Neofinetia × Luisia = Luinetia
 Neofinetia × Phalaenopsis = Phalanetia
 Neofinetia × Renanthera = Renanetia
 Neofinetia × Rhynchostylis = Neostylis (e.g. 'Lou Sneary')
 Neofinetia × Robiquetia = Robifinetia
 Neofinetia × Vanda = Vandofinetia
 Neofinetia × Aerides × Arachnis = Hanesara
 Neofinetia × Aerides × Ascocentrum = Aerasconetia
 Neofinetia × Aerides × Ascocentrum × Rhynchostylis = Moonara
 Neofinetia × Aerides × Ascocentrum × Vanda = Micholitzara
 Neofinetia × Aerides × Rhynchostylis × Vanda = Sanjumeara
 Neofinetia × Aerides × Vanda = Vandofinides
 Neofinetia × Ascocentrum × Cleisocentron = Ascocleinetia
 Neofinetia × Ascocentrum × Luisia = Luascotia
 Neofinetia × Ascocentrum × Luisia × Rhynchostylis = Dominyara
 Neofinetia × Ascocentrum × Renanthera = Rosakirschara
 Neofinetia × Ascocentrum × Renanthera × Rhynchostylis × Vanda = Knudsonara
 Neofinetia × Ascocentrum × Rhynchostylis = Rumrillara
 Neofinetia × Ascocentrum × Rhynchostylis × Vanda = Darwinara
 Neofinetia × Ascocentrum × Vanda = Nakamotoara
 Neofinetia × Ascocentrum × Vanda = Nakamotoara (e.g. 'Newberry Apricot')
 Neofinetia × Luisia × Vanda = Luivanetia
 Neofinetia × Renanthera × Rhynchostylis = Hueylihara
 Neofinetia × Renanthera × Vanda = Renafinanda
 Neofinetia × Rhynchostylis × Vanda = Yonezawaara (e.g. 'Blue Star')

References

Flora of China 25: 483–484. 2009.

Vandeae genera
Aeridinae
Historically recognized angiosperm genera